Sibirocosa manchurica is a species of wolf spiders only known from Primorsky Krai, Russia.

This spider, with a body length of up to 7.25 mm, is dark brown, sometimes almost black. The abdomen of the male is marked with a reddish heart-shaped mark and two rows of white spots. The abdomen of the female just has 4 pairs of white spots.

References 

Lycosidae
Spiders described in 2003
Spiders of Russia